Ariel Behar and Eduardo Dischinger were the defending champions, but Dischinger decided not to defend his title so Behar partnered Dino Marcan instead. Behar lost in the quarterfinals to Tallon Griekspoor and Tim van Rijthoven.

Wesley Koolhof and Matwé Middelkoop won the title after defeating Tallon Griekspoor and Tim van Rijthoven 6–1, 3–6, [13–11] in the final.

Seeds

Draw

References
 Main Draw

The Hague Open - Doubles